More Oar: A Tribute to the Skip Spence Album is a 1999 tribute album completed shortly before and released shortly after the death of Moby Grape founding member Skip Spence.  The album contains cover versions by various artists of Spence's music from his Oar album, released in 1969, presented in the same order as on the original album.  The album also contains a hidden bonus track of Spence's last known recording, "Land of the Sun", which was originally commissioned for the X-Files soundtrack, Songs in the Key of X, but not used.

History and critical reaction

The album was planned and produced by Bill Bentley, a music industry executive then associated with Warner Bros. Records, who had previously produced Where the Pyramid Meets the Eye: A Tribute to Roky Erickson (Warner Bros. Records/Sire, 1990).

More Oar has been described as a "heartfelt, eclectic homage" that "pays tribute to one of psychedelia's brightest lights, Skip Spence."  In relation to the inclusion of Spence's "Land of the Sun" as a hidden bonus track, critic Raoul Hernandez commented as follows:

...(i)t's Spence himself, who died at the age of 52...who saves the back end of More Oar with the mumbled, spacey, bongo madness of "Land of the Sun." A hidden bonus track deemed unworthy of 1996's X-Files spinoff, Songs in the Key of X, "Land of the Sun" brings More Oar full circle...(to) bookend an obscure chapter of rock & roll history that is finally becoming public record."

Critic Rob Brunner views the more successful covers as being those by artists with a particular appreciation of Spence's spirit:

The best contributions come from artists who realize that Spence's work is as much about atmosphere as words and chords. Robert Plant moans over ghostly vibes on "Little Hands"; Alejandro Escovedo offers an appropriately bleary "Diana", Spence's darkest song; and Flying Saucer Attack out-space the ultra-spaced-out Spence. Not everyone gets it, though. The Dūrocs (led by fellow San Fran hippie leftover Ron Nagle) and the Ophelias mistakenly believe that weird songs call for wacky performances, resulting in a sort of contrived lunacy that's at odds with Spence's unself-conscious outpourings. And Engine 54 contribute a puzzling ska track that's unrelated to both Spence and everything else on More Oar. Still, more often than not, More taps into the spirit of Oar — no easy feat.

Track listing

"Little Hands" - Robert Plant 4:22   
"Cripple Creek" - Mark Lanegan 2:12    
"Diana" - Alejandro Escovedo 4:08  
"Margaret/Tiger-Rug" - The Dūrocs 2:27   
"Weighted Down (The Prison Song)" - Jay Farrar & The Sir Omaha Quintet    
"War In Peace" - Mudhoney 3:15   
"Broken Heart" - Robyn Hitchcock 3:48  
"All Come To Meet Her" - Diesel Park West 4:06   
"Books Of Moses" - Tom Waits 3:01  
"Dixie Peach Promenade (Yin For Yang)" - Greg Dulli 3:03 
"Lawrence Of Euphoria" - The Ophelias 1:40  
"Grey - Afro" - Flying Saucer Attack 4:24   
"This Time He Has Come" - Alastair Galbraith 5:18  
"It's The Best Thing For You" - Engine 54 5:02  
"Keep Everything Under Your Hat" - Outrageous Cherry 3:18  
"Halo Of Gold" - Beck 4:32  
"Doodle" Minus 5 - 13:18
"Land of the Sun" - Skip Spence (hidden track)

Credits

David Katznelson Executive Producer
Bill Bentley Producer, Liner Notes
Stanley Mouse Artwork
Jimmy Hole Artwork, Art Direction
André Knect Mastering

References

1999 compilation albums
Rock compilation albums
Tribute albums
Birdman Records compilation albums